The 1953 Amateur World Series was the 14th Amateur World Series and ended a run when one was held every year or every other year; it would be eight years until the Series was reinstituted. The 1953 Series was held in Caracas, Venezuela from September 12 through October 9, 1953.

Final standings

References

Amateur World Series
Baseball World Cup
1953
Amateur World Series
Amateur World Series
Amateur World Series